The Monterrey College of Music and Dance (Escuela Superior de Música y Danza de Monterrey in Spanish)
is a public music college in Monterrey, Mexico.

Studies
The School offers bachelor degrees in Music and dance.

Facilities 
The school's campus is in central Monterrey, in the area known as Obispado. It occupies a large building with several large recital and rehearsal rooms, as well as library, teaching studios and practice rooms.

See also
 Monterrey

References

External links
Official Website

Music schools in Mexico
Educational institutions established in 1977
1977 establishments in Mexico